Amarjeet Dhanda is an Indian politician belonging to Jananayak Janata Party. He was elected as a member of the Haryana Legislative Assembly from Julana on 24 October 2019.

References

Living people
Jannayak Janta Party politicians
Indian National Lok Dal politicians
People from Jind district
Haryana MLAs 2019–2024
Year of birth missing (living people)